is a Japanese term for a live-in student/apprentice who trains under and assists a sensei on a full-time basis. The system exists in  
kabuki, rakugo, shogi, igo, aikido, sumo, karate and other modern Japanese martial arts.

Lifestyle
Uchi-deshi usually live  in the dōjō or the home of the teacher, or in separate accommodations near the dōjō. The deshi serves the teacher all day, every day. Duties may include cleaning and secretarial work. Some dojo have uchideshi rooms right in the dojo.

Historically, an uchi-deshi was typically chosen and groomed to become the next head of a school of martial arts when a direct family member was not available.  Nowadays, the term is used synonymously as an apprenticeship.

Related terms
Senshūsei and kenshūsei often refer to set training programs or goal-oriented training rather than students who have a special relationship with a teacher. For example, kenshūsei of the Kodokan dojo began training for Olympic Judo competition in 1960. The term renshū-sei (練習生) is used in Japanese pro wrestling. The term jikideshi translates to "personal pupil" and is a term used for students who show dedication and commitment to their master and/or school.

See also
Gurukula
Senpai and kōhai

References

External links
Patrick Augé Becoming an Uchideshi: How to Train Seriously in Japan aikidojournal.com

Japanese martial arts terminology